Polly Horvath (born 30 January 1957) is an American-Canadian author of novels for children and young adults. She won the 2003 U.S. National Book Award for Young People's Literature for The Canning Season, published by Farrar, Straus and Giroux.

Horvath was born and raised in Kalamazoo, Michigan. She has been writing since the age of eight. She attended college in Toronto as well as the Canadian College of Dance. She lived in New York City and Montreal before settling on southern Vancouver Island in British Columbia.

She was a finalist for the U.S. National Book Award for Young People's Literature in 1999 (The Trolls) and a runner-up for the Newbery Medal in 2002 (Everything on a Waffle) before winning the National Book Award. She won the TD Canadian Children's Literature Award in 2013 for One Year in Coal Harbor.

Horvath once declared: "I don't have that much fun writing them. I have the most fun when I'm on the last page."

She is married to Arnie Keller. They have two daughters, Emily and Rebecca.

Books
An Occasional Cow (1989)
No More Cornflakes (1990)
The Happy Yellow Car (1994)
When the Circus Came to Town (1996)
The Trolls (1999) — finalist, U.S. National Book Award; honor book, Boston Globe-Horn Book Award
Everything on a Waffle (2001) — Newbery Honor; Boston Globe-Horn Book Honor; International White Ravens 2002; Sheila A. Egoff Children's Literature Prize (British Columbia Book Prize for Children's Literature)
The Canning Season (2003) — Young Adult Canadian Book of the Year; U.S. National Book Award
The Pepins and their Problems (2004)
The Vacation (2005)
The Corps of the Bare-Boned Plane (2007) — Sheila A. Egoff Children's Literature Prize; finalist, Canadian Library Association's Young Adult Book of the Year
My One Hundred Adventures (2008): Sheila A. Egoff Children's Literature Prize; NAPPA Gold Award; Parent's Choice Gold Award
Northward to the Moon (2010)
Mr. and Mrs. Bunny—Detectives Extraordinaire! (2012)
One Year in Coal Harbor (2012)
Lord and Lady Bunny—Almost Royalty! (2014)

See also

References

External links
 
 
 Mrs. Bunny at LC Authorities

1957 births
American emigrants to Canada
American children's writers
American people of Hungarian descent
Canadian children's writers
Canadian people of Hungarian descent
National Book Award for Young People's Literature winners
Newbery Honor winners
Novelists from Michigan
Writers from British Columbia
Living people
20th-century American novelists
21st-century American novelists
20th-century Canadian women writers
20th-century Canadian writers
21st-century Canadian women writers
American women children's writers
American women novelists
20th-century American women writers
21st-century American women writers